{{Infobox rail line
| box_width                       = 25em
| name                            = M7 Yıldız–Mahmutbey
| color                           = F29FC0
| logo                            = Istanbul M7 Line Symbol (2020).svg
| logo_width                      = 30px
| logo_alt                        = 
| image                           = M7_kağıthane_istasyonu.jpg
| image_width                     = 275
| image_alt                       = 
| caption                         = Kağıthane Station
| type                            = Rapid transit
| system                          = Istanbul Metro
| status                          = In OperationMecidiyeköy - MahmutbeyIn Shuttle OperationMecidiyeköy - YıldızUnder Construction Kabataş - YıldızMahmutbey - Esenyurt MeydanIn Project Phase Esenyurt Meydan - Saadetdere | locale                          = Istanbul, Turkey
| start                           = Yıldız
| end                             = Mahmutbey
| stations                        = 17
| routes                          = 1
| daily_ridership                 = 
| ridership2                      = 
| open                            = October 28, 2020 (Mecidiyeköy - Mahmutbey section)January 2, 2023 (Mecidiyeköy - Yıldız section)
| close                           = 
| owner                           = Istanbul Metropolitan Municipality
| operator                        = Metro Istanbul A.Ş.
| character                       = 
| depot                           = Tekstilkent
| stock                           = 80 Hyundai Rotem  4 carriages per trainset
| linelength_km                   = 24.5
| linelength                      = 
| tracklength_km                  = 
| tracklength_mi                  = 
| tracklength                     = 
| tracks                          = 2
| gauge                           = 
| old_gauge                       = 
| load_gauge                      = 
| minradius                       = 
| racksystem                      = 
| linenumber                      = M7
| electrification                 = 1,500 V DC Overhead line
| speed_km/h                      = 80
| speed                           = 
| signalling                      = CityFlo650, Bombardier Transportation
| elevation_m                     = 
| elevation                       = 
| website                         = 
| map                             = 
| map_state                       = collapsed
}}

The M7, officially referred to as the M7 Yıldız–Mahmutbey metro line is a rapid transit line of the Istanbul Metro system on the European part of Istanbul, Turkey.

On 20 December 20, 2013, the line was commissioned to Kalyon Group for construction. The groundbreaking ceremony was held on 9 February 2014.

The line is divided into three phases. Currently, it is partly in service. The section between Mecidiyeköy and Mahmutbey was inaugurated on 28 October 2020. The Mecidiyeköy - Kabataş and Mahmutbey -  Esenyurt Meydan phases are still under construction, and there is also a planned  extension between the stations Esenyurt Meydan - Saadetdere.

When fully completed, The M7-line will be connecting twelve districts of the Istanbul metropolitan area, namely Beyoğlu, Beşiktaş, Şişli, Kağıthane, Eyüp, Gaziosmanpaşa, Esenler, Bağcılar, Küçükçekmece, Avcılar, Başakşehir and Esenyurt.  It is projected that 300 cars of driverless metro trains will carry about one million passengers daily. The total travel time will be 31.5 minutes between the termini. The M7 line costs  3.7 billion (approx. US$1 billion).'''

It was opened on January 2, 2023 as a shuttle between Mecidiyeköy and Yıldız. When the Kabataş stage is opened, the direct line will continue to the shuttle operation place. From Mecidiyeköy, 1 platform goes to Mahmutbey direction, the other platform goes to Yıldız direction. Yıldız is the deepest station on the Istanbul Metro at 71 metres.

Trains run on the Mecidiyeköy - Mahmutbey section every 6 minutes, and on the Yıldız - Mecidiyeköy section every 12 minutes

Stations

M7 Mecidiyeköy - Mahmutbey section
Şişli/Mecidiyeköy - Mahmutbey section opened on 28 October 2020, the Şişli/Meciyeköy - Mahmutbey section of the M7-line serves 15 metro stations across six districts of the Istanbul City. The combined length of the entire metro system in Istanbul has thus reached . The line is the second in automatic train operation (ATO) of Istanbul after the M5 Üsküdar–Çekmeköy line, and the first ATO line on the European side of the city. All stations have protective barriers with automatic doors, opening only when the train is stopped at the platform.

See also 
 Public transport in Istanbul
 Istanbul Metro
 Istanbul Metropolitan Municipality
 Metro İstanbul A.Ş.
 Istanbul modern tramways
 Istanbul nostalgic tramways

References

Istanbul Metro
Transport infrastructure under construction in Turkey
Beşiktaş
Beyoğlu
Şişli
Kağıthane
Eyüp
Esenler
Bağcılar
Railway lines opened in 2020
2020 establishments in Turkey